Minnampalli is a village in the Vazhapadi taluk of Salem district, in Tamil Nadu, India.

Geography
Minnampalli is within Vazhapadi taluk, which is in the central part of Salem district. The only railway line in Vazhapadi taluk, along with National Highway 79, pass to the south of the town.

Demographics
In 2011 Minnampalli had a population of 9,327 people living in 2,272 households. 4,770 (51.1%) of the inhabitants were male, while 4,557 (48.9%) were female. 1,001 children in the town, about 11% of the population, were at or below the age of 6. The literacy rate in the town was 69.0%. Scheduled Castes and Scheduled Tribes accounted for 51.9% and 0.06% of the population, respectively.

References

Villages in Salem district
Villages in Vazhapadi taluk